

Third-level list 
Third-level divisions are those under second level (counties, districts, cities, etc...) and they are townships, towns, municipalities, villages, etc... but the names vary by country.

In China Provinces are first level country administrative divisions, prefecture level cities are second level country administrative subdivisions, and counties are third level country administrative subdivisions.
The Unorganized borough is not any level of government structure but the List of country second level subdivisions by area page ranks it.

See also
 List of countries and dependencies by area
 List of country subdivisions by area
 List of country second level subdivisions by area

References 

 

Geography-related lists